Twin Lakes is a complex of two large lakes in Lake Clark National Park in the U.S. state of Alaska, near the northeast corner of Lake and Peninsula Borough. It contains a  upper lake and a smaller  lower lake, joined by a short connecting stream. The lakes outflow westward into the Chilikadrotna River (and eventually into the Mulchatna and Nushagak Rivers and Nushagak Bay). It is quite remote and unpopulated, except in the late summer as it is a popular hunting spot.

The lake complex was the retirement home of naturalist Richard Proenneke (1916–2003), who spent most (1968–1998) of the last 35 years of his life living there in a log cabin he built by hand. (See One Man's Wilderness: An Alaskan Odyssey and Alone in the Wilderness). It is only reachable by air taxi via a float or a wheel plane.

Gallery

References

External links
A satellite view of Dick Proenneke's cabin and Twin Lakes

Lakes of Lake and Peninsula Borough, Alaska
Lakes of Alaska